Benjamin Joseph Bradshaw (August 15, 1879 – April 19, 1960) was an American wrestler who competed in the 1904 Summer Olympics and won a gold medal in featherweight category. He was born in Brooklyn, New York.

References

External links
profile

1879 births
1960 deaths
Sportspeople from Brooklyn
Wrestlers at the 1904 Summer Olympics
American male sport wrestlers
Olympic gold medalists for the United States in wrestling
Medalists at the 1904 Summer Olympics